Ebba von Sydow (born 18 February 1981) is a Swedish journalist, author, columnist, TV personality that also run one of the most influential fashion and lifestyle blogs in Sweden.

Early life
Ebba von Sydow was born on 18 February 1981 in Gothenburg, Sweden.

Ebba is the great-granddaughter of the former Swedish Prime Minister, Oscar von Sydow. She is related to actor Max von Sydow and Social Democratic politician Björn von Sydow.

Career
Ebba von Sydow studied journalism in Boston, Massachusetts where she hosted a weekly radio show. She then went to law school in Stockholm. In 2001, she started working as a fashion reporter and columnist for evening paper Expressen. She went on to become editor in chief of Expressen Fredag.

In 2005, she became editor in chief of the long running Swedish fashion and lifestyle magazine VeckoRevyn. Prior to that she also worked at the music magazine Groove. She has also worked for Swedish national radio, SR P3.

In the summer of 2010, she hosted the broadcasts Wedding of Victoria, Crown Princess of Sweden, and Daniel Westling, for national television in Sweden.

Ebba presented the early night show Gokväll on Saturdays on SVT, Sweden's biggest network. She left the show in May 2015. She then went on to present the morning show Nyhetsmorgon broadcast on TV4.

Bibliography
 2006 - Ebbas stil - Ebba Style - The Ultimate Guide to a Better Wardrobe
 2011 - Kungligt snygg - Royal Style

Personal life
Ebba von Sydow married Johan Kleberg in January 2011, the couple live in Stockholm.

References

Further reading
 Crowning Miss Sweden Constructions of Gender, Race and Nation in Beauty Pageants.
 The Swedish-American Chamber of Commerce of San Francisco/Silicon Valley Interview with Ebba
 Introducing... Ebba von Sydow, The Local, February 19, 2007.

External links
Ebba's svt.se Blog (archive)
Ebba von Sydow on Twitter

1981 births
Living people
Swedish journalists
Swedish women journalists
Swedish women writers
Swedish women columnists
Swedish magazine editors
Women magazine editors